Sofia Eugenia Koutsovitis, known professionally as Sofia Rei, is an Argentinian vocalist, songwriter, producer, and educator. A classically trained mezzo-soprano, Rei's influences include South American folk styles, jazz, pop, new classical and electronic music. Singing in Spanish, English and Portuguese, her voice was described by The Boston Globe as "possessing a voluptuously full voice, comprehensive command of Latin American rhythms, and encyclopedic knowledge of folkloric forms from Argentina, Peru, Colombia, and Uruguay." She was born and raised in Buenos Aires and has been based in New York since 2005.

Two of her albums won Independent Music Awards for Best Album in the World Beat category. She has worked with John Zorn, Bobby McFerrin, Marc Ribot, and Maria Schneider.

She is the co-founder of El Colectivo Sur, an arts collective based in New York City that aims to increase public awareness of South American music and assemble diverse communities. She curates its flagship program, the New York City South American Music Festival. She teaches at Berklee College of Music's Global Initiatives, including its itinerant program Berklee Latino directed by Oscar Stagnaro and Javier Limón.

Early life and education
Rei was born in Buenos Aires to Andres Koutsovitis, a civil engineer, and Maria Cristina Reigadas, a philosopher, professor and researcher. She began to study music at 4, and as a child she sang with vocal groups and school choirs. She began her professional career at nine as a member of the Colón Teatro Children's Choir, and later joined Argentina's National Children's Choir at Teatro Nacional Cervantes.

Rei stopped performing professionally as she started high school at Colegio Nacional de Buenos Aires. She discovered punk rock, and started to play the drums, but sang mainly "in the shower."  She returned to her formal music education in college as a voice major at the National Conservatory.

As an undergraduate, Rei studied opera with Professor Marta Blanco. In 1997, she joined the National Youth Choir of Argentina (CONAJO) under the direction of Maestro Nestor Zadoff, as a contralto. Her musical interests extended beyond the classical world, however, and she led "a double life" as a "properly educated classical singer during the day and everything else at night." At 19, she was exposed to jazz for the first time and began to learn about vocal improvisation, frequently working with young composers and exploring ways to use her voice as she premiered their new works. Fully immersed in improvised music and jazz, Rei decided to come to the United States to continue her education. In 2001, she moved to Boston to study
jazz and improvisation at the New England Conservatory of Music. There, her teachers included Charlie Banacos, Danilo Perez, Dominique Eade, Steve Lacy, Bob Moses and Jerry Bergonzi. Encouraged by one of her teachers, George Russell, Rei began to write her own music. While at the conservatory, she met bassist Jorge Roeder, with whom she frequently collaborates. She graduated from the New England Conservatory with a Master's in Jazz and Improvisation in 2003.

Career
In 2003, while living in Boston, Rei, Roeder, and drummer "Coqui" Perez-Albela formed Avantrio to explore the music of Peruvian composers such as Chabuca Granda, Felipe Pinglo and Nicomedes Santa Cruz. The concept was later expanded to include South American folk music,
especially from Argentina and Brazil. Rei created the Sofia Koutsovitis Group, an octet which also included Roeder and Coqui Pérez Albela, along with Leo Genovese on piano, Jason Palmer on trumpet, Adam Schneit on alto sax, Dan Blake on soprano and tenor sax, and Richie Barshay on drums.

Rei moved to New York in 2005, and in 2006 toured internationally with the Maria Schneider Jazz Orchestra. Her debut album, Ojalá, recorded with an octet, was released that same year. Composed of arrangements of her own compositions and songs by Argentinean, Brazilian and Cuban composers, the album was named one of the year's Top 10 records by The Jazz Journalist's Association. All About Jazz described it as "eclectic and exciting," and wrote that it "exemplifies the recent trends in Latin Jazz and Latin American music in general, and proves why Sofia Koutsovitis is one of the most versatile and in-demand singers in the New York music scene."

In 2008, she sang with Bobby McFerrin in Instant Opera, a piece commissioned by John Zorn, at Carnegie Hall.  She also collaborated with Geoff Keezer on his Grammy-nominated album, Aurea. 

In 2009, Rei released her second album, Sube Azul. She wrote eight of the twelve tracks which appeared on Sube Azul, and co-produced the album with Roeder. Allmusic wrote: "Koutsovitis employs a sort of South American bohemian aura, using hip cultural landmarks, feelings of love and regret, and an expanded color palette to weave some magical spells over anyone who comes close to her muse...As an individual, she's hard to compare to any predecessor, except her joy and passion could rival Flora Purim, Celia Cruz, or Abbey Lincoln."  The album won the Best World Beat Album at the 2009 Independent Music Awards, and Rei was named Best Latin Jazz Vocalist of 2009 by Latin Jazz Corner. 

In a review of a live performance, the Boston Phoenix wrote: "Koutsovitis's savvy arrangements of originals and covers kept juggling instrumentation and modulated dynamics — soft, rubato introductions segueing into rollicking 6/8 dance themes. There were spellbinding duets with Roeder and Genovese, call-and-response vocals with the band, and two-beat audience clap-alongs. And always those rhythms — from Argentine zamba (not Brazilian samba, she was quick to point out) to Peruvian lando to Argentine chacarera, on which she accompanied herself with the tiny 10-string charango. She explained the Spanish lyrics of loss, hardship, and celebration, but the music didn't need much in the way of translation. The meaning was in her voice and in the sound of this band."
  
Later in 2009, Rei contributed her vocals to Lova Zhurbin's Niña Dance, a song cycle inspired by the unsolved murders & disappearances of women and young girls in the city of Juárez, Mexico. Commissioned by the Carnegie Hall Corporation, the premiere of the piece took place at Zankel Hall.  Rei was chosen as a featured vocalist to premier the work as part of The Jazz Gallery's "New Voices" concert series.

Rei's third album, De Tierra y Oro, was released in 2012. Co-produced by Rei, Roeder and Fab Dupont, it was recorded with electric guitars, loops and drum machines as well as Andean charangos, Paraguayan harps, Colombian marimbas from the Pacific Coast, Argentine bombos, and Peruvian cajones. Named Best World Beat Album at the 2013 Independent Music Awards, Rei described it as a "series of ‘philosophical wanderings’ — songs that draw on a wide range of South American folkloric influences and bracingly modern sounds."

Rei has toured Europe, North and South America performing at international festivals and venues including Carnegie Hall, the Kennedy Center, (Washington DC), SF Jazz (San Francisco), the International Jazz en Lima Festival (Peru), Teatro Colsubsidio (Bogotá, Colombia), Wien Konzerthaus (Vienna, Austria), Cité de la Musique (Paris, France), North Sea Jazz (Netherlands), Tom de Festa (Portugal), the Buenos Aires International Jazz Festival (Argentina).

Mycale, The Song Project, and other collaborations
Rei is a founding member of Mycale, a New-York based international a cappella quartet with Ayelet Rose Gottlieb (Israel), Malika Zarra (Morocco) and Basya Schechter (United States). Mycale was commissioned by composer John Zorn to arrange, perform and record compositions from his
Book of Angels: Masada Book II. Their first album, Mycale: Book of Angels 13 was released on Tzadik Records in early 2010. The second album, Gomory, was released in 2015 on Tzadik with Sara Serpa (Portugal) as a new member of the band.

Rei is also part of John Zorn’s Song Project with Mike Patton and Jesse Harris. The project was put together by Zorn on his 60th birthday as a 30 year retrospective. The band features an "all star band of Zorn regulars" including Marc Ribot, John Medeski, Kenny Wollesen, Trevor Dunn,  Joey Baron and Cyro Baptista.

Additionally, Rei performs with Myra Melford’s Language of Dreams project. She has recorded, performed or collaborated with artists including Frank London, the Klezmatics, Guillermo Klein, Ezequiel Viñao, the Panamerican Symphony Orchestra, Clarice Assad, Curupira, Las Añez, Celso Duarte, Lionel Loueke, John Scofield, Danilo Perez, Susana Baca, Eva Ayllon, Pavel Urkiza, Russ Ferrante, Bob Moses, Steve Lacy, Aquiles Baez, C4 Trio,
Aca Seca, Pedrito Martinez and La Bomba de Tiempo.

Teaching
Rei works with Berklee College of Music's Global Initiatives in various programs including its itinerant project Berklee Latino. She has been a member of the Voice department and Songwriting department since 2011. She has taught at the New England Conservatory and the New York Jazz Academy, and teaches vocal improvisation and styles training workshops internationally.

Media Appearances
Rei appeared unscripted on the program Conan in a remote with Conan O'Brien. She was talking on her phone with her sister when Conan, who was looking for an address while doing a comedy bit of delivering Chinese food, saw her while she was reclining on the open window of her apartment and greeted her. She greeted back, gave him directions and taught him to drink Argentinian mate. The video can be found on the official YouTube channel of Conan O'Brien, called Team Coco.

Awards
Jazz Journalists Association Top Ten Records of 2006 
Latin Jazz Corner, Best Latin Jazz Vocalist of 2009
Independent Music Award, World Beat, Best Album (2009)
Independent Music Award, World Beat, Best Album (2013)
Independent Music Award, World Beat, Best Song (2013)
Independent Music Award, Best Concept Album (2018)

Discography

As Sofia Rei/Sofia Rei Koutsovitis
 Ojalá (Ojala, 2006)
 Sube Azul (Global Village/Harmonia Mundi, 2009)
 De Tierra y Oro (Cascabelera, 2012)
 El Gavilán (Cascabelera,  2017)
 Umbral (Cascabelera, 2021)

As guest
 Alcatraz, Alcatraz Lima (Limon, 2007)
 Clarice Assad, Imaginarium (Adventure, 2014)
 Bituin, Punto y Raya (Bituin, 2014)
 Raynald Colom, Rise (Jazz Village, 2012)
 Curupira, La Gaita Fantástica (Nova et Vetera, 2015)
 Folklore Urbano, Corazón (Chonta, 2009)
 Forro in the Dark/Forro Zinho, Forro in the Dark Plays Zorn (Tzadik, 2015)
 Jesse Harris, No Wrong No Right (Dangerbird, 2015)
 Andy McWain, Resemblance (Fuller Street, 2007)
 Nando Michelin, Como Arboles (2011)
 Mycale, Book of Angels Vol. 13 (Tzadik, 2010)
 Mycale, Gomory: Book of Angels Vol. 25 (Tzadik, 2015)
 Numinous, The Music of Joseph C. Phillips Jr. (Vipassana Innova, 2009)
 Diego Obregón & Grupo, Chonta Pequeña Historia (2012)
 Edward Perez, The Year of Two Summers (Lima Limon, 2008)
 The Song Project, Live at Le Poisson Rouge (Tzadik, 2015)
 The Song Project, Vinyl Singles Edition (Tzadik, 2014)
 Samuel Torres, Yaounde (Blue Conga, 2010)
 Ezequiel Viñao, Sonetos de Amor (Tlon, 2015)
 John Zorn, The Book Beri'ah : Keter (Tzadik, 2018)

References

External links
Official website 
Tiny Desk Concert
Sofia Rei at AllMusic

Year of birth missing (living people)
Living people
Berklee College of Music faculty
People from Buenos Aires
New England Conservatory alumni
Argentine musicians